Tere Mere Sapne may refer to:

 Tere Mere Sapne (1971 film), a Hindi film directed by Vijay Anand
 Tere Mere Sapne (1996 film), a Hindi film produced by Amitabh Bachchan 
 Tere Mere Sapne (TV series), an Indian drama-series, 2009–2011
 "Tere Mere Sapne" or "Tere Mere Sapne Ab Ek Rang Hai", a song from the 1965 Hindi film Guide